Kim Daejung Convention Center station is a station of Gwangju Metro Line 1 in Mareuk-dong, Seo-gu District, Gwangju, South Korea. The Gwangju Metropolitan Rapid Transit Corporation is near the station. The station name comes from Kim Daejung Convention Center, which is nearby the station.

It is a management station that manages from this station to Pyeongdong station. It is connected to the Airport station through the Hakja Tunnel.

Station layout

Exits

External links

  Cyber station information from Gwangju Metropolitan Rapid Transit Corporation
  Cyber station information from Gwangju Metropolitan Rapid Transit Corporation

Gwangju Metro stations
Seo District, Gwangju
Railway stations opened in 2004
Kim Dae-jung